Muhammad Abdul Latif, also known as MA Latif, was a Bangladeshi politician and former Member of Parliament. He represented the Awami League in the Sylhet-10 constituency following the country's first general elections.

Early life and family
Abdul Latif was born into a Bengali Muslim family in the village of Ganglazur in Zakiganj (then under Karimganj subdivision), Sylhet district.

Career
In the Pakistan period, Abdul Latif participated in the Bengali Language Movement and six point movement, and became a freedom fighter during the Bangladesh Liberation War. Following independence, the first general elections were held in 1973, with Abdul Latif winning as an Awami League candidate in the Sylhet-10 constituency.

He died in Bangladesh.

References

Awami League politicians
People from Zakiganj Upazila
1st Jatiya Sangsad members
Year of birth missing